The Price of Pride is a lost 1917 American silent Western film directed by Harley Knoles and starring Carlyle Blackwell, June Elvidge and Evelyn Greeley.

Cast
 Carlyle Blackwell as David / William 
 June Elvidge as Nan Westland 
 Frank R. Mills as Jeffrey Arnold Black 
 Evelyn Greeley as Kathleen May 
 George MacQuarrie as Ben Richardson 
 Charles W. Charles as Judge Endicott 
 Pinna Nesbit as Madge Endicott Black

References

Bibliography
 Langman, Larry. American Film Cycles: The Silent Era. Greenwood Publishing, 1998.

External links
 

1917 films
1917 lost films
1917 Western (genre) films
1910s English-language films
Films directed by Harley Knoles
Lost American films
Lost Western (genre) films
Silent American Western (genre) films
World Film Company films
1910s American films